Five Clues to Fortune is a 1957 British crime film directed by Joe Mendoza and starring David Hemmings, John Rogers and Roberta Paterson. Its plot involves four children who try to prevent an aristocrat's secretary from secretly selling the aristocrat's country house. It was sometimes shown as an 8-part serial. The film score was composed by Max Saunders and 	Jack Beaver.

Cast
 John Rogers - Michael
 Roberta Paterson - Jill
 Peter Godsell - Mark
 David Hemmings - Ken
 Dafydd Havard - Jonas
 Norman Mitchell - Bert
 David Cameron - Mr. King
 Peter Welch - Mr. Strong
 Philippa Hiatt - Mrs. Strong

References

External links

1957 films
1957 crime drama films
British crime drama films
Films scored by Jack Beaver
Films set in country houses
1950s English-language films
1950s British films